The 1967 Campeonato Brasileiro Série A (officially the 1967 Taça Brasil) was the 10th edition of the Campeonato Brasileiro Série A. Palmeiras won the championship, the 3rd national title of the club in 8 years of tournament contention.

Northern Zone

Northern Group

Northern Group Finals

Northeastern Group

Northeastern Group Finals

Northern Zone Decision

Central Zone

Central Zone Decision

Southern Zone

Quarterfinals

Semifinals
Cruzeiro and Palmeiras enter in this stage

Final

References

External links
1967 Taça Brasil

Bra
Taca
Taça Brasil seasons
B